Blaque is an American girl group that charted from 1999 to 2004. Outside of the United States, they are known as Blaque Ivory. Their self-titled debut album Blaque sold more than 1 million copies and was certified Platinum. The group's debut included the platinum-selling lead single "808", a second single, "I Do", and the international pop hit "Bring It All to Me". In 1999, Billboard named Blaque the 4th Best New Artist of the year, with "Bring It All to Me" landing at number 30 on the 2000 Year End Chart. In 2002 and 2003, the group released three less successful singles, "Can't Get It Back", "Ugly", and "I'm Good", the latter appearing in the film Honey.

Blaque worked on two unreleased albums in the mid-to-late 2000s before their disbandment in 2008. The group attempted a comeback in 2012, but it was cut short by Natina Reed's accidental death. In 2019, Blaque's intended third album Torch was released under the label Blaque/The Move Entertainment.

Discovery 
Natina Reed and Shamari Fears both moved to Atlanta, Georgia, and met while in high school. Reed formed Blaque while Fears formed another group called Intrigue. Intrigue won a recording contract with Elektra Records, and Fears met up with Brandi Williams at a talent show while a member of that group. Fears left Intrigue to join up with Reed in Blaque and Williams joined the group shortly thereafter. Reed met Ronald Lopes while singing jingles to earn extra cash and he introduced her to his sister Lisa "Left Eye" Lopes of TLC. Lisa Lopes signed the group to her production company, Left Eye Productions.

Blaque has said that their name means "Believing in Life and Achieving a Quest for Unity in Everything".

Music career

1997–2000: Debut 
In 1997, the group made a cameo appearance in the video Lil' Kim's "Not Tonight (Remix)".

Their self-titled debut debuted at number 23 on Billboards Top R&B/Hip-Hop albums chart, and at number 53 on the official Billboard 200 and was certified platinum by RIAA. The album's lead single "808" was a success in the U.S. reaching number 8 on the Billboard Hot 100 singles chart and earning Gold certification. The follow-up single "I Do" was not a success like the previous singles, reaching number 73 on the R&B/Hip-Hop single chart. The music video for "I Do" was nominated for a MTV Video Music Award for Best Editing. The last single "Bring It All To Me", which featured JC Chasez, was a hit song that made the number 5 position on the Billboard Hot 100 singles chart and topped the Rhythmic charts in late 1999 to early 2000 for six weeks.

In mid-1999, Blaque toured as one of the opening acts for boy band 'N Sync. Blaque also performed as one of the opening acts for TLC's FanMail Tour later that year.

In 2000, the group starred as cheerleaders in the film Bring It On and went to the studio and recorded the Shelly Peiken and Guy Roche song "As If" for the soundtrack that same year. A remixed version of the Blaque song "Bring It All To Me" appeared in the film, with added rapping by 50 Cent.

 2001–2002: Blaque Out 
While their self-titled debut album went platinum, the second album called Blaque Out, which was set for release in 2001, was shelved as the group was dropped from Columbia Records for unknown reasons. The video for the first single "Can't Get It Back" was never released. The album was soon leaked on the Internet. After Lopes's death in a car crash in Honduras on April 25, 2002, the group signed with Elektra Records. They began work on their third album after Reed gave birth to a son. An alternate version of the shelved album was released to iTunes on May 22, 2007, but was later taken down. In December 2011, Blaque Out was released back onto iTunes.

 2005–2012: Reunion, Reed's death 
Fears was signed to Darkchild Records in 2005. Williams also signed a new record deal and started working on a solo album. She also provided vocals on the hook of Nelly's single "Grillz".

In 2005, Blaque came back together to record their studio album Private Show (originally titled Beauty). They worked on the album sporadically from 2005 to 2009. Blaque agreed to film a show Blaque In the House set to air in the summer of 2008; however, the show was never picked up, and the album went unreleased. Blaque released four songs on YouTube: "Cut You Off", "All Nighter", "Blue Jeans" and "High Definition" before they decided to disband.

On July 28, 2012, Blaque reunited for the Left Eye Music Festival in Decatur, Georgia. At the event, Blaque performed their single "808". Shortly after, the group contracted with artist manager Inga "Nandi" Willis, and started working on an album and a reality television show.

On October 26, 2012, Reed died after being hit by a car near Atlanta, Georgia. The group broke up shortly after her death. Two days later, "Cut You Off", a song intended for the album, leaked via the internet.

 2003–2019: Torch, change in lineup 
Blaque's intended third album, Torch, featured Missy Elliott, songwriter Linda Perry, and producer Rodney Jerkins. The intended single "Blackout" was derided as a "rip-off" of 50 Cent's song "In da Club".

"I'm Good" appeared on the soundtrack for the 2003 film Honey.

Torch was scheduled to be released exclusively to iTunes in 2008, nearly five years after its completion by Music World Entertainment, but this was canceled. It has been confirmed that Mathew Knowles owns the rights to the albums Torch and Blaque Out.

On May 31, 2019, Blaque released Torch under the label Blaque/The Move Entertainment.

 Other media 
In addition to their recording work, Reed, Fears, and Williams appeared in the 2000 film Bring It On as members of the East Compton Clovers cheerleading squad, fronted by Gabrielle Union. Williams also had a small role (playing herself) in the 2001 movie On the Line. Blaque also appears on Lisa "Left Eye" Lopes's 2001 solo debut album, Supernova, on the track titled "Head to the Sky", which was only released internationally. In 2005, two clips of Fears's solo songs titled "The One" and "NJ2" were leaked onto the internet.

 Discography 

 Albums 

 Singles 

 Compilations 
 2007: Blaque by Popular Demand

 Other appearances 

 Tours 
 NSYNC in Concert (1999)
 TLC: FanMail Tour (1999)

 Awards and nominations MTV Video Music AwardsBET AwardsSoul Train Lady Of Soul AwardsBillboard Video Awards'''

 Filmography 

 Films 
1999: Soul Train (cameo)
1999:  Motown Live (cameo)
2000: Bring It On2000: All That (cameo)
2000: Disney's 2 Hour Tour (cameo)
2002: V.I.P. (cameo)
2003: Honey (cameo)
2020: Say Yes To The Dress: Atlanta'' (cameo)

Notes

References

External links 
Blaque on Facebook
Blaque on Twitter

American contemporary R&B musical groups
Musical groups reestablished in 2019
Musical groups reestablished in 2012
Musical groups established in 1996
Musical groups disestablished in 2008
American pop music groups
Musical groups from Georgia (U.S. state)
African-American girl groups
American musical trios
American pop girl groups